This is a list of satellite, digital and cable television channels in Meitei language (officially known as Manipuri language) broadcasting at least throughout Manipur and other Northeast Indian states.

Government owned channels

Educational channels

Entertainment and music channels

News channels

See also 

 Directorate of Language Planning and Implementation
 Meitei Language Day
 List of Meitei-language films
 List of Meitei-language newspapers
 List of 4K channels in India
 List of HD channels in India
 Assamese television channels
 Bengali television channels
 Hindi television channels

References 

Meitei language
Meitei language-related lists
Manipur-related lists
Mass media in Manipur
Meitei
Lists of television channels in India